Capital Games is a 2013 American gay-themed film directed by Ilo Orleans. Produced by G.A. Hauser as based upon her own book, and with a screenplay by Wendell Lu, the film premiered at Qfest in 2013.

Plot
The film follows the lives of two impressive, ambitious and sleek men. One of the two men is Steve Miller (Eric Presnall), a mature, strong, clean-cut man who leaves his job as an LAPD police officer in Los Angeles in pursuit of a calmer and less hectic career. The second prominent character is Mark Richfield (Rory Cosgrove), who proves to be lively, charismatic, charming and lovable around the office. Mark's attractive character and his superior communication skills places him in a unique position to apply for a promotion. Miller has ambitions for a top position in the advertising company and is hopeful to win the job until he learns of the new hot-shot, Mark, in the office. Mark's charm and passion wins him favor with his colleagues and boss, bringing in jealousy between the two.

Steve realizes that the corporate world is just as mean and cut-throat as the streets of Los Angeles, when the new British hire is still a shoo-in for his position, pushing him further into jealousy. The two antagonists head out for a team-building exercise in the Santa Fe desert for a business retreat that goes wrong. The two men find themselves igniting affection and sharing a passionate night, leaving the two deeply conflicted. Steve is later devastated by his discovery that Mark is engaged to marry in a month's time, to a fiancé who is too excited about the wedding. The two fight between passionate love and mutual respect and the growing hate caused by their career competition and growing affection.

Cast

 Shane Keough as Jack Larsen
 Eric Presnall as Steve Miller
 Rory Cosgrove as Mark Richfield
 Bob Hosko as Harold Parsons
 Jordan Rivers as Kevin
 Dewitt Duncan as Charlie
 Corinne Fox as Sharon Tice
 Rebekah Apodaca as Laura
 Paula Ray as Sonya Knight
 John Schaaf as ex-Sgt Dick Miller
 Paul Caster as Mr. Foist
 Lena Ann Balambao as Steve's Mom
 Scott Herald as Sharon's father
 Chuck Erickson as Roland
 G.A. Hauser as Ms Bakewell
 Julian Cordova as Ad executive
 Dion Hindi as Ad executive
 Patricia Jimenez as Ad executive
 Alicia R. Martinez as Ad executive
 Angela Miesch as Ad executive
 Cindy Wilson as Ad executive
 Jeree Tomasi as Ad executive
 James Wisniewski as Ad executive- Foist
 Emily Layton as Petula- ranch facilitator
 Terrilyn Morris as Amber / receptionist
 Earl Schwers as Justice of the Peace
 Robb Moon as Waiter
 Jim Mixon as Restaurant patron
 Kerryanne Devine as Restaurant patron
 Cristo Cabrera as Restaurant patron
 Melven Louis as Restaurant patron
 Maxx Wayne as Restaurant patron

References

External links
 
  as archived July 16, 2014
 
 
 

American LGBT-related films
Gay-related films
2010s English-language films
2010s American films